Cycas riuminiana, commonly known as the Arayat pitogo or simply pitogo, is a species of cycad endemic to Luzon, Philippines. It is also locally known as bayit in Tagalog and sawang in Ilocano, among other names.

Distribution
There are five subpopulations of Cycas riuminiana.
Pampanga province, near Mount Arayat
Bataan province, near Morong and Bagac
Batangas province, near Lobo
Isabela province, near Mount Dipalayag
Aurora province, near Baler

Uses
Young curled-up fronds of C. riuminiana are edible and can be cooked as vegetables. The ripe seeds are poisonous, but they can be crushed and soaked in water several times to remove the toxins before being dried and processed into a flour-like substance used for making small cakes or gruels.

See also
 Cycas circinalis
 Cycas rumphii

References

riuminiana
Endemic flora of the Philippines
Flora of Luzon